Alison Stewart is an American journalist.

Alison Stewart or Allison Stewart may also refer to:

Alison Stewart (As the World Turns)
Alison Stewart (biologist) (born 1957), New Zealand academic and plant pathologist
Alison Hewson, née Stewart